The 2012 Derby City Council election took place on 3 May 2012 to elect members of Derby City Council in England. The Labour Party gained control of the council, which had previously been under No Overall Control.

Election results

All comparisons in vote share are to the corresponding 2008 election.

Ward results

Abbey

Allestree

Alvaston

Arboretum

Blagreaves

Boulton

Chaddesden

Chellaston

Darley

Derwent

Littleover

Mackworth

Mickleover

Normanton

Oakwood

Sinfin

Spondon

References

2012 English local elections
2012
2010s in Derby